Ein ad-Duyuk al-Foqa, also called Duyuk, is a Palestinian village in the Jericho Governorate in the eastern West Bank situated in the Jordan Valley, located  northwest of Jericho. According to the Palestinian Central Bureau of Statistics, Ein ad-Duyuk al-Foqa had a population of over 814 inhabitants in mid-year 2006. In 1997, refugees constituted 27.9% of the population. The primary health care for the village is through contributions from the Ministry of Health and Medical Relief Committee.

History

Antiquity

Under the Seleucid Empire, the peak of nearby Jebel Quruntul was fortified and garrisoned to control Jericho and the roads leading through the mountains from it to Jerusalem. The original Hebrew name is not preserved except in the Greek transcriptions of 1 Maccabees and Josephus, which call it Dok and Dagon. It was the scene of Simon Maccabeus's assassination by his son-in-law Ptolemy. The later lavra monastery beside the Grotto of the Temptation also had a name transcribed into Greek as Douka.

Ottoman era
It was noted as mazra’a (=cultivated land) near Riha in the 945 AH/1538-1539 CE Ottoman tax records, and as  a mazra’a near An-Nuway'imah in the 1005 AH/1596-1597 CE tax records.

In 1838 Edward Robinson noted the "large and beautiful fountain or rather fountains" at Duk.

In 1883,  the PEF's Survey of Western Palestine noted at Ain ed Duk: "Near this spring a tomb was examined in the side of the hill. It is a chamber with 21 kokim in two tiers. There are other caves near it, and broken sarcophagi. The one excavated measures 16 feet by 17 feet. The lower tier contains three kokim at the back, and 4 each side. The upper tier has only three on the left hand side. The kokim are 2 feet wide, 6 feet 8 inches long, and 3 feet 4 inches high. Near the same place were found two shafts 3 feet long and 2 feet 8 inches diameter."

British Mandate era
In the 1922 census of Palestine conducted  by the British Mandate authorities, ad-Duyuk, together with  Al-Auja and Nweimeh  had a population of 332; 322 Muslims and 10 Christians, where the Christians were 7 Orthodox, and 3 Syrian Catholic. In the  1931 census Duyuk had a population of 291 Muslims, in 66 houses.

In  the 1945 statistics, Duyuk's population was 730 Muslims and it had jurisdiction over 21,332 dunams of land. Of this, 399 dunams were for citrus and bananas, 2,050 dunams were for plantations and irrigable land, 1,171 for cereals, while a total of 17,712 dunams were non-cultivable areas.

Jordanian era
In the wake of the 1948 Arab–Israeli War, and after the 1949 Armistice Agreements, Duyuk came under Jordanian rule.

Post-1967
Since the Six-Day War in 1967, Duyuk has been under Israeli occupation.

In 1994, Ein ad-Duyuk al-Foqa and An Nuwei'ma were constituted as a single local council. After  the 1995 accords, 52.3% of the land of Ein ad-Duyuk al-Foqa is classified as Area A, the remaining 47.7% is Area C.

See also
 'Ein ad-Duyuk at-Tahta
 Dok, an ancient fortress on nearby Mount Quruntul

References

Bibliography

 (pp. 173, 209)

External links
Welcome To Duyuk
An Nuwei'ma and 'Ein ad Duyuk al Foqa Town (Fact Sheet),  Applied Research Institute–Jerusalem, ARIJ
An Nuwei'ma & 'Ein ad Duyuk al Foqa Town Profile, ARIJ
An Nuwei'ma & 'Ein ad Duyuk al Foqa aerial photo, ARIJ
Locality Development Priorities and Needs in An Nuwei'ma and 'Ein ad Duyuk al Foqa, ARIJ
Survey of Western Palestine, Map 18: IAA, Wikimedia commons

Jericho Governorate
Villages in the West Bank
Municipalities of the State of Palestine